The Houston Film Critics Society Award for Best Supporting Actress is an annual award given by the Houston Film Critics Society. It is given in honor of an actress who has delivered an outstanding performance in a supporting role.

Winners
 † = Winner of the Academy Award for Best Supporting Actress
 ‡ = Nominated of the Academy Award for Best Supporting Actress

2000s

2010s

2020s

Multiple Winners

2 Wins
 Viola Davis (2008, 2016)

References
 Houston Film Critics Society official website

Houston Film Critics Society
Film awards for supporting actress